Marymount International School Paris in Neuilly-sur-Seine, France is an international school in the Paris metropolitan area and is part of the Religious of the Sacred Heart of Mary network of Marymount schools.

The history of Marymount Paris can be traced back to 1846 when Father Jean Gailhac founded an order of Sisters in Béziers in the south of France. The objective, considered a progressive idea at that time, was the education of young women. Schools eventually opened in Portugal, England, Ireland and the United States. 

When Marymount College was opened in Tarrytown, New York in 1908, the founder's new vision was to educate from an international perspective. Study abroad centers were then established in London, Paris and Rome. Marymount Paris opened on September 30, 1923 in town of Neuilly-sur-Seine, just outside Paris.

Today, Marymount International School Paris provides an international curriculum, in English and French, to students aged 2 to 14.

Notable alumni 
Famous alumni include Chicago Bulls player Joakim Noah and Anna-Catherine Hartley (also known as Uffie), singer on the French label Ed Banger Records and James Thiérrée (actor, performer, artist and grandson of Charlie Chaplin).

References

American international schools in France
Educational institutions established in 1846
International schools in Île-de-France
Schools in Hauts-de-Seine
1846 establishments in France